Kathryn ("Kathy") Ann Watt (born 11 September 1964) is an Australian racing cyclist who won two medals at the 1992 Summer Olympics in Barcelona, Spain (gold in the road race, and silver in the pursuit).
She has won 24 national championships in road racing, track racing, and mountain bike, four Commonwealth Games gold medals, and came third in the world time trial championship. She was made a life member of Blackburn Cycling Club in 1990. She was an Australian Institute of Sport scholarship holder.

The daughter of marathoner Geoff Watt, Kathy Watt turned first to running, winning the national junior 3 km championship. She began to train on a bike after achilles tendon problems. For a while, she competed in duathlon (running and cycling), but found she was a better cyclist than runner.

In 1996, Watt was in a legal dispute with the Australian Cycling Federation over who would race the pursuit in the Olympic Games. Watt had been told that she would be but was replaced a few days before the event by Lucy Tyler-Sharman. Watt appealed to the International Court of Arbitration for Sport, claiming a breach of contract. The court ordered Watt to be reinstated in the race.

In 2000, Watt again became involved in a controversy over a selection, but this time she was not successful in her appeal to the CAS.

She retired after 2000 but came back three years later but was not successful in an attempt to qualify for the 2004 Olympics. After another retirement, Watt worked as a coach and personal trainer. However, she made another comeback to qualify for the 2006 Commonwealth Games in Melbourne, where she won a silver medal in the time trial. In January 2006, she won the time trial section of the Australian open road championship in Buninyong, Ballarat.

Watt holds a Bachelor of Science degree from the University of Melbourne, with a major in physiology and pathology. She studied nutrition, anatomy, and physiotherapy. She attended Tintern Church of England Girls' Grammar, now Tintern Grammar.

In 2015, she was an inaugural Cycling Australia Hall of Fame inductee.

Palmarès
Source:

1990
Commonwealth Games
Road Race – 1st
Track Pursuit – 2nd
Giro d'Italia
Final Overall GC – 3rd
1 stage victory
1992
Olympic Games
Road Race – Gold Medal
3 km Pursuit (track) – Silver
 Australian Road Race Championships – 1st
1994
Giro d'Italia
Final Overall GC – 2nd
3 stage victories
Giro del Piave – 1st
Canberra Stage Race
Final Overall GC – 1st
5 stage victories
1995
World Time Trial Championship – 3rd
1996
 Australian Championships
Road Race – 2nd place
Time Trial – 1st place
1997
Oceania Championships
Road Race – 2nd place
Time Trial – 1st place
1998
World Time Trial Championship – 6th
GP des Nations Time Trial – 2nd
Grande Boucle (Tour Cycliste Féminin)
stage 12b – 3rd
Tour Féminin de Bretagne
Overall – 2nd
Prologue – 2nd
stage 1 – 1st
stage 5 – 2nd
Grazia Tour
Overall – 2nd
stage 2 – 2nd
stage 3 – 3rd
stage 4 – 1st
Tour de l'Aude
Overall – 7th
Prologue (Gruissan) – 2nd
stage 5 (Castelnaudary TT)- 2nd
stage 6a (Axat to Belcaire) – 2nd
GP Presov and Pravda
Overall – 1st
stage 1 (TT) – 1st
stage 2 (Criterium) – 2nd
stage 3 (Road Race) – 3rd
stage 4 (Road Race) – 3rd
1999
Tour de 'Toona
Overall – 2nd
stage 2 – 3rd
stage 4 – 2nd
stage 5 – 1st
Grazia Tour
Overall – 7th
stage 3 – 3rd
Women's Challenge
stage 4 (Sun Valley Time Trial) – 5th
stage 9 (Burley to Buhl) – 2nd
Tour de Snowy
stage 5 – 3rd
2005
Chrono Champenois – 1st
GP International Feminin Bretagne (cat. 2) – 2nd GC
Thuringen-Rundfahrt (cat. 1) – stage
2006 (Lotto-Belisol Ladiesteam)
Commonwealth Games
Individual road time trial – 2nd
Australian Open Road Championship Time Trial – 1st
2007
Australian Open Road Championship
Time Trial – 2nd
Road Race – 9th
 1st Overall Tour de Perth
2008
 Australian Open Road Championship
Time Trial – 4th
Road Race – 19th

References

External links
 Kathy Watt's web site
 AOC Kathy Watt profile
 Leunig & Farmer Eyecare

1964 births
Living people
Olympic gold medalists for Australia
Australian Institute of Sport cyclists
Australian female cyclists
Olympic cyclists of Australia
Cyclists at the 1992 Summer Olympics
Cyclists at the 1996 Summer Olympics
Cyclists at the 1990 Commonwealth Games
Cyclists at the 1994 Commonwealth Games
Cyclists at the 1998 Commonwealth Games
Cyclists at the 2006 Commonwealth Games
Sportswomen from Victoria (Australia)
Olympic medalists in cycling
Cyclists from Melbourne
Medalists at the 1992 Summer Olympics
Olympic silver medalists for Australia
Commonwealth Games gold medallists for Australia
Commonwealth Games silver medallists for Australia
Commonwealth Games bronze medallists for Australia
Commonwealth Games medallists in cycling
Sport Australia Hall of Fame inductees
Medallists at the 1990 Commonwealth Games
Medallists at the 1994 Commonwealth Games
Medallists at the 1998 Commonwealth Games
Medallists at the 2006 Commonwealth Games